The John C. Ainsworth House is a historic building in Oregon City, Oregon, United States. It was built in 1851 for John C. Ainsworth, the main founder of the Oregon Steam Navigation Company. It is one of the oldest structures in the Portland area and remains in good condition. It is also the only two-story portico in Oregon.  The house was added to the National Register of Historic Places in 1973.

See also
National Register of Historic Places listings in Clackamas County, Oregon
Maud and Belle Ainsworth House
Belle Ainsworth Jenkins Estate

Further reading
Hawkings, William J., III, and William F. Willingham. Classic Houses of Portland, Oregon, 1850–1950. Portland: Timber Press, 1999

References

External links

Houses completed in 1851
Houses on the National Register of Historic Places in Oregon
Buildings and structures in Oregon City, Oregon
Greek Revival houses in Oregon
National Register of Historic Places in Clackamas County, Oregon
Houses in Clackamas County, Oregon
1851 establishments in Oregon Territory
Historic American Buildings Survey in Oregon